Backstage: Music Inspired by the Film is the soundtrack to the Chris Fiore's 2000 documentary film Backstage. It was released on August 29, 2000 via Roc-A-Fella Records. 

Recording sessions took place at The Hit Factory, at Manhattan Center, at Soundtrack Recording Studios, at Baseline Studios, at Sony Music Studios, at Mirror Image Recorders, at Right Track Recording and at Unique Recording Studios in New York City, at the Enterprise in Burbank, at Cash Money Studios in Metairie, at PatchWerk Recording Studios and at Stankonia Recording in Atlanta, at Criteria Studios in Miami, at Lamp City, and at Doppler Studios. 

Production was handled by several record producers, including Alchemist, Earthtone III, Irv Gotti, Ken "Duro" Ifill, Mannie Fresh, Poke & Tone, Redman, Scott Storch, Swizz Beatz, Timbaland and DJ Clue.

It features contributions from Jay-Z, Ja Rule, Memphis Bleek, Amil, Big Tymers, Cam'ron, Capone-N-Noreaga, Christión, Da Brat, Da Ranjahz, Eve, Fabolous, Hot Boys, Juelz Santana, Killer Mike, Lady Luck, Lil' Cease, Mýa, Outkast, Prodigy, Redman, Rell, Slimm Calhoun, T-Boz and The Lox.

The mixtape was a commercial success, peaking at number six on the Billboard 200 and topping the R&B/Hip-Hop Albums chart at number 1. It was certified gold by the Recording Industry Association of America on December 4, 2000 for sales of over 500,000 copies.

There were four singles released from the project: Mýa & Jay-Z's "Best of Me, Part 2" with music video directed by Hype Williams, Beanie Sigel's "In the Club" with music video directed by Jeremy Rall, Prodigy's "Keep it Thoro" with music video directed by Diane Martel, and Memphis Bleek's "My Mind Right" with music video directed by Nzingha Stewart.

Track listing

Sample credits
Track 2 contains excerpts from "Make the Music with Your Mouth, Biz", written by Marcel Theo Hall and Marlon Williams, and performed by Biz Markie
Track 5 contains an interpolation from "The Monk", written and performed by Lalo Schifrin
Track 9 contains a sample of "Lullaby", performed by Peter White
Track 19 contains samples from "The Big One (There from The People's Court)", written by Alan Tew

Charts

Weekly charts

Year-end charts

Certifications

See also
List of Billboard number-one R&B albums of 2000

References

External links

2000 soundtrack albums
Hip hop soundtracks
Albums produced by DJ Clue?
Albums produced by Irv Gotti
Albums produced by Timbaland
Documentary film soundtracks
Albums produced by Swizz Beatz
Albums produced by Mannie Fresh
Albums produced by Scott Storch
Albums produced by Trackmasters
Roc-A-Fella Records soundtracks
Albums produced by the Alchemist (musician)